Shirley A. Mullen is a Canadian academic administrator served as the fifth president of Houghton College. She was named president emerita prior to her resignation in April 2021. Prior to becoming president, Mullen was provost at Westmont College in Santa Barbara, California, where she was awarded faculty/staff membership in Omicron Delta Kappa.

During her time as president, she elected to sell Houghton College's satellite campus located in West Seneca, New York to shift more focus to the Buffalo area.

Education
Mullen earned a Bachelor of Arts degree from Houghton College in 1976, followed by a Master of Arts from the University of Toronto. Mullen then earned two doctorates, one in history from the University of Minnesota and the other in philosophy from the University of Wales.

Publications
Dissertation, Organized freethought: the religion of unbelief in Victorian England
Between "Romance" and "True History": Historical Narrative and Truth Telling in a Postmodern Age
Faith, Learning, and the Teaching of History

References

External links 
 

 

University of Minnesota College of Liberal Arts alumni
Living people
1954 births
Houghton University alumni
University of Toronto alumni
Heads of universities and colleges in the United States